Mosha Gaolaolwe (born 25 December 1993) is a Motswana footballer playing as a centreback for Botswana Premier League club Township Rollers. He is also a full Botswana international.

Honours

Club
 Township Rollers
 Botswana Premier League: 3
2016-17, 2017-18, 2018-19
 Mascom Top 8 Cup: 1
2017-18

Individual
FUB Team of the Year: 2017

References

Living people
1993 births
Botswana footballers
Botswana international footballers
Botswana expatriate footballers
Expatriate soccer players in South Africa
Township Rollers F.C. players
TS Galaxy F.C. players
Association football central defenders